Chunal is a hamlet in Derbyshire, England. It is located on the A624 road, 1 mile south of Glossop. The philosopher Ludwig Wittgenstein conducted aeronautical research at Chunal during his time as an engineering research student at Manchester University (1908–1911). He flew kites into the upper atmosphere.

There are three listed buildings in the locality, all designated at Grade II: White House, a farmhouse dated 1669; an 18th-century barn to the south of Shepley Farm; and Horseshoe Farmhouse and an adjacent barn. A public house, the Grouse Inn, closed in 2014/15 and is now a private house.

Transport
There are several bus stops going through the hamlet towards Charlestown, Glossop, Buxton and Macclesfield.

References

Hamlets in Derbyshire
High Peak, Derbyshire